Wesley Lavern Packard (February 6, 1918 – September 25, 1972) was a member of the Wisconsin State Assembly.

Biography
Packard was born on February 6, 1918, in Coffee Creek, Montana. He graduated from Poynette High School in Poynette, Wisconsin before attending the Reppert School of Auctioneering. During World War II, he served in the United States Army. He died on September 25, 1972.

Political career
Packard was elected to the Assembly in 1966 and 1968. In addition, he was mayor of Lodi, Wisconsin from 1948 to 1952, as well as assessor of Lodi from 1959 to 1969. He was a Republican.

References

External links

People from Fergus County, Montana
People from Lodi, Wisconsin
Republican Party members of the Wisconsin State Assembly
Mayors of places in Wisconsin
Military personnel from Wisconsin
United States Army soldiers
United States Army personnel of World War II
1918 births
1972 deaths
20th-century American politicians